William Brent Jr. (January 13, 1783 – May 13, 1848) was an American lawyer, politician and diplomat from Stafford County, Virginia who served two terms in the Virginia House of Delegates and as the United States Chargé d'Affaires, Argentina from June 14, 1844, to July 7, 1846.

Early and family life
He was born to the former Dorothy Leigh and her husband, Robert Brent, of a distinguished family in Stafford County, Virginia and who became the mayor of Washington, D.C. His uncle, Col. William Brent (1775-1848), served as in Virginia's Fifth Convention during the American Revolutionary War, as well as several terms in the Virginia House of Delegates representing Stafford County, and later as secretary to President Thomas Jefferson and finally as clerk of the U.S. District Court in Washington, D.C. This William Brent received a private education suitable to his class, graduated from the College of William and Mary and married Mary Fenwick.

Virginia planter and politician
Stafford County voters twice elected Brent as one of their (part-time) representatives in the Virginia House of Delegates between 1810 and 1811. In 1820 he owned slaves, and also in 1830.

Diplomacy in Argentina
Brent was named as the United States Chargé d'Affaires for Argentina on June 14, 1844, and presented his credentials on November 15, 1844.  Shortly after his arrival in Buenos Aires, France and England began their five-year blockade of the city. Brent attempted to mediate the conflict, but his efforts were unsuccessful and his own government did not support him.

References

External links
US State Department - Chiefs of Mission for Argentina: William Brent

1783 births
1848 deaths
Ambassadors of the United States to Argentina
19th-century American diplomats
Virginia lawyers
Members of the Virginia House of Delegates
College of William & Mary alumni
19th-century American politicians
American slave owners
19th-century American lawyers